Cinclidium stygium is a species of moss belonging to the family Mniaceae.

It is native to Eurasia and America.

References

Mniaceae